Stone Hall can refer to:

China
 Stone Hall of Jijian Temple, Suzhou, Jiangsu Province

United States

 Stone Hall, Atlanta University, now known as Fountain Hall at Morris Brown College, listed on the National Register of Historic Places (NRHP) in Fulton County, Georgia
 Stone Hall (Cockeysville, Maryland), listed on the NRHP in Baltimore County, Maryland
 Stone Hall (Ithaca, New York), listed on the NRHP in Tompkins County, New York
 Stone Hall (Nashville, Tennessee), listed on the NRHP in Davidson County, Tennessee

Architectural disambiguation pages